Events from the year 1755 in Sweden

Incumbents
 Monarch – Adolf Frederick

Events

 
 
 
 - Birgitta Holm is exiled for having converted to Catholicism. 
 - Careening is banned.
 - First issue of the first politician paper in Sweden, En Ärlig Svensk.
 - Publication of Hjelpreda i hushållningen för unga fruentimber by Cajsa Warg.

Births

 4  September - Axel von Fersen the Younger, diplomat and alleged lover of Marie Antoinette  (died 1810)
 4  September - Adolf Ludvig Stierneld, politician  (died 1835)
 26 September - Hans Henric von Essen, politician  (died 1824)
 19 August- Helena Quiding, culture personality and builder  (died 1819)

Deaths

References

 
Years of the 18th century in Sweden
Sweden